Nikolay Nikolov (born 21 May 1985) is a Bulgarian footballer, who plays as a midfielder for Kariana Erden.

Career statistics
As of 5 June 2012

References

Living people
1985 births
Bulgarian footballers
PFC CSKA Sofia players
FC Chavdar Etropole players
FC Botev Vratsa players
First Professional Football League (Bulgaria) players
Association football midfielders